Virgil O'Sullivan (May 7, 1918 – December 27, 2010) served in the California State Senate for the 8th district from 1959 to 1967 and during World War II he served in the United States Army.

References

United States Army personnel of World War II
1918 births
2010 deaths
20th-century American politicians
Democratic Party California state senators